The following is a list of California cities, towns, and census-designated places in which a majority (over 50%) of the population is Hispanic or Latino, according to data from the 2010 Census.

Note: Although Hispanics or Latinos form 50% or more of the population, they are still outnumbered by non Hispanics in terms of population. The following places highlighted in bold Indicates that Hispanics or Latinos both form 50% or more of the population and where Hispanics outnumber any specific non-Hispanic racial group.

Places with over 100,000 people

Places with between 25,000 and 100,000 people

Places with between 10,000 and 25,000 people

Places with between 5,000 and 10,000 people

Places with fewer than 5,000 people

See also
 List of U.S. communities with Hispanic-majority populations in the 2010 census
 List of Texas communities with Hispanic majority populations in the 2000 census
 List of U.S. counties with Hispanic- or Latino-majority populations

References 

Hispanic and Latino American culture in California
Hispanic and Latino demographics in the United States
Hispanic